Adam Etches (born 26 January 1991) is a retired British professional boxer who fought at middleweight.

Starting out and amateur career
Etches started out as a kickboxer and won various titles and trophies but decided to take up boxing as it was a more viable career option for him.

Etches quickly progressed in the unpaid side of the sport and reached the semi-finals of the 2009 Novice Amateur Boxing Association Championships. However, when he was defeated he was asked by Hatton Promotions Head of Boxing Richard Poxon to turn professional.

Professional career

Etches vs. Walsh 
Etches made his professional debut at the De Vere Whites Hotel in Bolton and stopped Lester Walsh in two rounds.

He added another four names to his perfect record and hoped that promoter Ricky Hatton would reward him with his first title opportunity in 2012.

Etches vs. Khomitsky 
He suffered his first defeat on 28 March 2015 to Sergey Khomitsky via 4th round knockout, losing the IBF international Middleweight Championship.

Etches vs. Ryder 
Etches fought John Ryder on 4 February, 2017. Ryder won the fight via unanimous decision in their 12 round contest. The scorecards were 111-117, 112-116, 109-118 in favor of Ryder.

References

External links 
 Official site
 Boxers profiles
 Adam Etches - Profile, News Archive & Current Rankings at Box.Live

1991 births
Living people
English male boxers
Light-middleweight boxers
Sportspeople from Sheffield